During the 2006–07 A.C. ChievoVerona season, they competed in Serie A.

Season summary

First-team squad
Squad at end of season

Left club during season

Competitions

Serie A

References

A.C. ChievoVerona seasons
Chievo